At Last is a studio album by American singer Gladys Knight. It was released by MCA Records on November 21, 2000 in the United States. The album won the Grammy Award for Best Traditional R&B Vocal Album at the 43rd awards ceremony.

Critical reception

Allmusic editor Liana Jonas found that on "At Last marks a refreshing return by Gladys Knight, who doesn't miss a beat," calling it "a much-welcomed return by the gifted vocalist who easily adapts to contemporary music without compromising her signature sweet tones. The 13 tracks featured on At Last are a blend of mid-tempo R&B fare and ballads. Because Knight seamlessly incorporates a 2001 music sensibility to this recording, At Last can comfortably sit alongside works by Destiny's Child, Toni Braxton, Faith Evans, and other younger musical counterparts [...] Being out of the studio for six years has had no effect on Knight, as she is in top form. Her voice is rich, soulful, and silk."

Track listing

Charts

Release history

References 

Gladys Knight albums
2000 albums
MCA Records albums